The April 2015 Qalamoun incident was a series of attacks made on targets in Qalamoun region of Syria on the morning on 25 April 2015. The targets were the Brigade 155 (main Syrian Scud missile-base) and Brigade 65 bases in the Qalamoun. Two weapons convoys were also targeted, reportedly killing one person. According to an opposition source, the targets were Hezbollah camps and ammo storages within the two bases. Several explosions were heard in the areas of Kteife, Yabrud and a village in Qalamoun. Plumes of smoke were seen above the Brigade 65 base, shortly after the strikes.

According to conflicting sources the attack was attributed to a ground attack by Al-Nusra Front, or an air operation of the Israeli Air Force. Unprecedently, unlike previous cases of no comment, Israeli official sources denied any involvement of Israeli forces in the incident.

References

2015 in the Syrian civil war
April 2015 events in Syria
Rif Dimashq Governorate in the Syrian civil war
Airstrikes during the Syrian civil war
Military operations of the Syrian civil war in 2015
Military operations of the Syrian civil war involving the al-Nusra Front
Hezbollah involvement in the Syrian civil war
Hezbollah–Israel conflict
Iran–Israel conflict during the Syrian civil war
Israeli involvement in the Syrian civil war